Withington is a suburban area of Manchester, England

Withington may also refer to:

People with the surname 
 Alfreda Bosworth Withington (1860–1951), American physician and author
 Dick Withington (1921–1981), English footballer
 Harry Withington (1868–1947), English footballer
 John Withington (1865–1944), Australian politician
 Leonard Withington (1789–1885), American minister and author
 Lothrop Withington (1856–1915), American genealogist, historian, and book editor
 Paul Withington (1888–1966), American football player
 Shane Withington (b. 1958), Australian actor
 William H. Withington (1835–1903), American Union Army general

Places

England
 Withington (ward), an electoral ward of Manchester 
 Withington, Gloucestershire
 Withington, Herefordshire
 Withington, Staffordshire
 Withington, Shropshire
 Lower Withington, Cheshire

United States
 Withington Estate, listed on the NRHP in Middlesex County, New Jersey
 Withington Wilderness, New Mexico

Transportation
Withington railway station (Gloucestershire), former station in Withington, Gloucestershire, England
Withington railway station (Herefordshire), former station in Withington, Herefordshire, England
Withington tram stop, Greater Manchester
Withington and West Didsbury railway station, former station in Greater Manchester